The Crisis of the Late Middle Ages was a series of events in the fourteenth and fifteenth centuries that ended centuries of European stability during the Late Middle Ages. Three major crises led to radical changes in all areas of society: demographic collapse, political instability, and religious upheavals.

The Great Famine of 1315–1317 and Black Death of 1347–1351 reduced the population perhaps by half or more as the Medieval Warm Period came to a close and the first century of the Little Ice Age began. It took until 1500 for the European population to regain the levels of 1300. Popular revolts in late-medieval Europe and civil wars between nobles such as the Wars of the Roses were common—with France fighting internally nine times—and there were international conflicts between kingdoms such as France and England in the Hundred Years' War. 

The unity of the Roman Catholic Church was shattered by the Western Schism. The Holy Roman Empire was also in decline; in the aftermath of the Great Interregnum (1247–1273), the Empire lost cohesion and the separate dynasties of the various German states became more politically important than their union under the Emperor.

Historiography 
The expression "Crisis of the Late Middle Ages" is commonly used in western historiography, especially in English and German, and somewhat less in other western European scholarship, to refer to the array of crises besetting Europe in the 14th and 15th centuries. The expression often carries a modifier to specify it, such as the Urban Crisis of the Late Middle Ages, or the Cultural, Monastic, Religious, Social, Economic, Intellectual, or Agrarian crisis, or a regional modifier, such as the Catalan or French crisis. 

By 1929, the French historian Marc Bloch was already writing about the effects of the crisis, and by mid-century there were academic debates being held about it. In his 1981 article Late Middle Age Agrarian Crisis or Crisis of Feudalism?, Peter Kriedte reprises some of the early works in the field from historians writing in the 1930s, including Marc Bloch, Henri Pirenne, Wilhelm Abel, and Michael Postan.  Referring to the crisis in Italian as the "Crisis of the 14th Century", Giovanni Cherubini alluded to the debate that already by 1974 had been going on "for several decades" in French, British, American, and German historiography.

Arno Borst (1992) states that it "is a given that fourteenth century Latin Christianity was in a crisis", goes on to say that the intellectual aspects and how universities were affected by the crisis is underrepresented in the scholarship hitherto ("When we discuss the crisis of the Late Middle Ages, we consider intellectual movements beside religious, social, and economic ones"), and gives some examples.

Some question whether "crisis" is the right expression for the period at the end of the Middle Ages and the transition to Modernity. In his 1981 article The End of the Middle Ages: Decline, Crisis or Transformation? Donald Sullivan addresses this question, claiming that scholarship has neglected the period and viewed it largely as a precursor to subsequent climactic events such as the Renaissance and Reformation.

In his "Introduction to the History of the Middle Ages in Europe", Mitre Fernández wrote in 2004: "To talk about a general crisis of the Late Middle Ages is already a commonplace in the study of medieval history."

Heribert Müller, in his 2012 book on the religious crisis of the late Middle Ages, discussed whether the term itself was in crisis:

No doubt the thesis of the crisis of the late Middle Ages has itself been in crisis for some time now, and hardly anyone considered an expert in the field would still profess it without some ifs and buts, and especially so in the case of German Medieval historians.

In his 2014 historiographical article about the crisis in the Middle Ages, Peter Schuster quotes the historian Léopold Genicot's 1971 article "Crisis: From the Middle Ages to Modern Times": "Crisis is the word which comes immediately to the historian's mind when he thinks of the fourteenth and the fifteenth centuries."

Demography

Some scholars contend that at the beginning of the 14th century, Europe had become overpopulated. By the 14th century frontiers had ceased to expand and internal colonization was coming to an end, but population levels remained high.

The Medieval Warm Period ended sometime towards the end of the 13th century, bringing the "Little Ice Age" and harsher winters with reduced harvests. In Northern Europe, new technological innovations such as the heavy plough and the three-field system were not as effective in clearing new fields for harvest as they were in the Mediterranean because the north had poor, clay-like soil. Food shortages and rapidly inflating prices were a fact of life for as much as a century before the plague. Wheat, oats, hay and consequently livestock, were all in short supply.

Their scarcity resulted in malnutrition, which increases susceptibility to infections due to weakened immune systems. In the autumn of 1314, heavy rains began to fall, which were the start of several years of cold and wet winters. The already weak harvests of the north suffered and the seven-year famine ensued. In the years 1315 to 1317 a catastrophic famine, known as the Great Famine, struck much of North West Europe. It was arguably the worst in European history, perhaps reducing the population by more than 10%.

Most governments instituted measures that prohibited exports of foodstuffs, condemned black market speculators, set price controls on grain and outlawed large-scale fishing. At best, they proved mostly unenforceable and at worst they contributed to a continent-wide downward spiral. The hardest hit lands, like England, were unable to buy grain from France because of the prohibition, and from most of the rest of the grain producers because of crop failures from shortage of labor. Any grain that could be shipped was eventually taken by pirates or looters to be sold on the black market.

Meanwhile, many of the largest countries, most notably England and Scotland, had been at war, using up much of their treasury and creating inflation. In 1337, on the eve of the first wave of the Black Death, England and France went to war in what became known as the Hundred Years' War. This situation was worsened when landowners and monarchs such as Edward III of England (r. 1327–1377) and Philip VI of France (r. 1328–1350), raised the fines and rents of their tenants out of a fear that their comparatively high standard of living would decline.

When a typhoid epidemic emerged, many thousands died in populated urban centres, most significantly Ypres (now in Belgium). In 1318 a pestilence of unknown origin, sometimes identified as anthrax, targeted the animals of Europe, notably sheep and cattle, further reducing the food supply and income of the peasantry.

Little Ice Age and the Great Famine 
As Europe moved out of the Medieval Warm Period and into the Little Ice Age, a decrease in temperature and a great number of devastating floods disrupted harvests and caused mass famine. The cold and the rain proved to be particularly disastrous from 1315 to 1317 in which poor weather interrupted the maturation of many grains and beans, and flooding turned fields rocky and barren. Scarcity of grain caused price inflation, as described in one account of grain prices in Europe in which the price of wheat doubled from twenty shillings per quarter in 1315 to forty shillings per quarter by June of the following year. Grape harvests also suffered, which reduced wine production throughout Europe. The wine production from the vineyards surrounding the Abbey of Saint-Arnould in France decreased as much as eighty percent by 1317. During this climatic change and subsequent famine, Europe's cattle were struck with Bovine Pestilence, a pathogen of unknown identity.

The pathogen spread throughout Europe from Eastern Asia in 1315 and reached the British Isles by 1319. Manorial accounts of cattle populations in the year between 1319 and 1320, places a sixty-two percent loss in England and Wales alone. In these countries, some correlation can be found between the places where poor weather reduced crop harvests and places where the bovine population was particularly negatively affected. It is hypothesized that both low temperatures and lack of nutrition lowered the cattle populations' immune systems and made them vulnerable to disease. The mass death and illness of cattle drastically affected dairy production, and the output did not return to its pre-pestilence amount until 1331. Much of the medieval peasants' protein was obtained from dairy, and milk shortages likely caused nutritional deficiency in the European population. Famine and pestilence, exacerbated with the prevalence of war during this time, led to the death of an estimated ten to fifteen percent of Europe's population.

Climate change and plague pandemic correlation 
The Black Death was a particularly devastating epidemic in Europe during this time, and is notable due to the number of people who succumbed to the disease within the few years the disease was active. It was fatal to an estimated thirty to sixty percent of the population where the disease was present. While there is some question of whether it was a particularly deadly strain of Yersinia pestis that caused the Black Death, research indicates no significant difference in bacterial phenotype. Thus environmental stressors are considered when hypothesizing the deadliness of the Black Plague, such as crop failures due to changes in weather, the subsequent famine, and an influx of host rats into Europe from China.

Popular revolt 

Before the 14th century, popular uprisings were not unknown, for example, uprisings at a manor house against an unpleasant overlord, but they were local in scope. This changed in the 14th and 15th centuries when new downward pressures on the poor resulted in mass movements and popular uprisings across Europe. To indicate how common and widespread these movements became, in Germany between 1336 and 1525 there were no less than sixty phases of militant peasant unrest.

Malthusian hypothesis
Scholars such as David Herlihy and Michael Postan use the term Malthusian limit to explain some calamities as results of overpopulation. In his 1798 Essay on the Principle of Population, Thomas Malthus asserted that exponential population growth will invariably exceed available resources, making mass death inevitable. In his book The Black Death and the Transformation of the West, David Herlihy explores whether the plague was an inevitable crisis of population and resources. In The Black Death; A Turning Point in History? (ed. William M. Bowsky), he "implies that the Black Death's pivotal role in late medieval society ... was now being challenged. Arguing on the basis of a neo-Malthusian economics, revisionist historians recast the Black Death as a necessary and long overdue corrective to an overpopulated Europe."

Herlihy also examined the arguments against the Malthusian crisis, stating "if the Black Death was a response to excessive human numbers it should have arrived several decades earlier" in consequence of the population growth before the Black Death. Herlihy also brings up other, biological factors that argue against the plague as a "reckoning" by arguing "the role of famines in affecting population movements is also problematic. The many famines preceding the Black Death, even the 'great hunger' of 1315 to 1317, did not result in any appreciable reduction in population levels". Herlihy concludes the matter stating, "the medieval experience shows us not a Malthusian crisis but a stalemate, in the sense that the community was maintaining at stable levels very large numbers over a lengthy period" and states that the phenomenon should be referred to as more of a deadlock, rather than a crisis, to describe Europe before the epidemics.

See also
 The Autumn of the Middle Ages
 Crisis of the Third Century
 A Distant Mirror: The Calamitous 14th Century
 The General Crisis
 History of science in the Middle Ages
 Late Middle Ages
 Medieval demography
 Renaissance of the 12th century
 Renaissance of the 15th century

Citations

General and cited sources

Further reading

External links
 The Waning of the Middle Ages': Crisis and Recovery, 1300–1450"—Lecture 11, Western Civilization to 1650 (42.125), M. Hickey, Bloomsburg University of Pennsylvania

Demography
Late Middle Ages
Medieval politics
Medieval society